Four new inventions is a slogan that is propagandized by the Chinese state media, named after the Four Great Inventions in ancient China. In the year 2017, Chinese state media started to claim that mainland China invented high-speed rail, mobile payment, e-commerce, and bike-sharing. However, none of those "four new inventions" were actually invented in mainland China.

High-speed rail 
High-speed rail is a type of rail transport that operates significantly faster than traditional rail traffic, using an integrated system of specialized rolling stock and dedicated tracks. "High-speed" is defined by the European Union as at least 250 km/h on new tracks, and 200 km/h on older tracks. The first high-speed train  in the world was the Tōkaidō Shinkansen in Japan, whose service started in 1964, with the maximum speed 210 km/h.

In mainland China, "high-speed" is defined as at least 250 km/h by design, with the minimum speed 200 km/h during initial service. In the year 2008, the first Chinese high-speed railway, known as the Beijing–Tianjin intercity railway, started its service. China claimed to have the largest high-speed rail system in the world in the year 2016.

E-commerce 
E-commerce was invented in 1979 by Michael Aldrich. The first internet shop was the NetMarket in 1994.

In mainland China, the e-commerce began in the year 1999, such as Dangdang and Joyo.com (now Amazon China). After that, Taobao was founded by Jack Ma in 2003, and then 360buy (now JD.com) was founded in 2004.

Mobile payment 
Mobile payment generally refer to payment services operated under financial regulation and performed from or via a mobile device. It was originated in Finland in the year 1997.

In mainland China, mobile payments started from the beginning of the 21st century, famous for Alipay and WeChat Pay. According to the statistics, market penetration of mobile payments is 77% in mainland China, and 48% in the US, and 27% in Japan.

Bike-sharing 
A bike-sharing system is a service in which bicycles are made available for shared use to individuals on a very short-term basis for a price. The first bike-sharing system, known as the "white bicycle plan", was introduced in Amsterdam in the year 1965.

In mainland China, the bike-sharing system started from ofo in the year 2014, and then there came the Mobike in the year 2015.

References 

2017 in China
Propaganda in China